Fritz Wepper (born 17 August 1941, Munich, Germany) is a German film and television actor. He is best known for his role as Inspector Harry Klein in the long-running crime series Derrick (1974–1998). Wepper is also remembered for his roles in the films Cabaret (1972) and The Bridge (1959) and as Mayor Wöller in the TV series Um Himmels Willen (2002–2021).

Life and career
Fritz Wepper was born as the son of a lawyer who was missing in action as a soldier in Poland in 1945. He started his acting career in a production of Peter Pan at the age of eleven. He got his first important film role in Tischlein deck dich, a film adaption of the Brothers Grimm fairytale The Wishing Table. His breakthrough role was as a young soldier in Bernhard Wicki's anti-war film Die Brücke (1959) which won the Golden Globe Award for Best Foreign Language Film. Wepper kept his popularity with German audiences into adulthood and appeared in several notable German films of the 1960s. In 1972 he played Fritz Wendel, a Jew passing as a Christian, in the Oscar-winning film version of Cabaret, opposite Liza Minnelli and Marisa Berenson.

His character Harry Klein, the assistant in the long-running crime series Derrick, became a cult figure all over the world. He played this role between 1974 and 1998 in 281 episodes of Derrick. Before playing Klein in Derrick he portrayed the same character on the popular television drama Der Kommissar (1969–1976) from the series' start until 1974 when he was transferred to Derrick. Harry Klein was replaced by his brother Erwin (played by Fritz Wepper's real-life brother Elmar Wepper).

Fritz and Elmar Wepper appeared together in the television series Zwei Brüder (1994–2000), playing a pair of different brothers hunting criminals and solve difficult cases. From 2002 until the show's cancellation in 2021, Wepper played the sneaky and sly, but ultimately good-hearted Mayor Wolfgang Wöller in the TV series Um Himmels Willen, which was for many years one of the most-watched German television series (with some 7,2 million views per episode).

Personal life 
Wepper married Angela von Morgen in 1979. His daughter, Sophie is also an actress, they appeared together in the crime series Mord in bester Gesellschaft between 2007 and 2017. Wepper made headlines in the yellow press when he left his wife Angela for the younger Susanne Kellermann (born 1974) in 2009. He has a daughter (born 2012) from the relationship with Kellermann, but later returned to his wife. Angela von Morgen died in January 2019, aged 76, following a cerebral haemorrhage. In 2020, Wepper married Susanne Kellermann.

Since they met during the filming of Cabaret in 1971, Wepper and Liza Minnelli are close friends.

Selected filmography

 The Dark Star (1955)
 Tischlein deck dich (Table, Donkey and Stick, 1956) .... Michel mit der grünen Kappe
 Rübezahl (1957) .... (uncredited)
 Eine verrückte Familie (1957) .... Hermann Bunzel
 Zwei Matrosen auf der Alm (1958) .... Friseurlehrling
 The Crammer (1958) .... (uncredited)
 The Angel Who Pawned Her Harp (1959) .... Christian
 Die Brücke (The Bridge, 1959) .... Albert Mutz
 My Schoolfriend (1960) .... Paul (uncredited)
 Question 7 (1961) .... Heinz Dehmert – Jugendführer
  (1961, TV Movie) .... George Gibbs
 Miracle of the White Stallions (1963) .... Rider Hans
 The River Line (1964) .... Philip
 Three Rooms in Manhattan (1965) .... Fabien (uncredited)
 When Night Falls on the Reeperbahn (1967) .... Till Voss
 The Doctor of St. Pauli (1968) .... Hein Jungermann
  (1968) .... Peter Mertens
 Der Kommissar (1968–1974, TV Series) .... Harry Klein
 The Man with the Glass Eye (1969) .... Lord Bruce Sheringham
 On the Reeperbahn at Half Past Midnight (1969) .... Till Schippmann
 Slap in the Face (1970) .... Peter Terbanks (voice, uncredited)
 We'll Take Care of the Teachers (1970) .... Hubert Böhm
 The Games (1970) .... Gregorye Kovanda
  (1970) .... Hans Engelmann
  (1970) .... Jürgen
 Cabaret (1972) .... Fritz Wendel
  (1972) .... Momme Linnau
 Der Ehefeind (1972)
 Derrick (1974–1998, TV Series) .... Harry Klein
 Le Dernier Combat (The Last Battle, 1983) .... Captain
 Zwei Brüder (Two Brothers, 1994–2001, TV Series) .... Christoph Thaler
 Drei in fremden Betten (1996, TV Movie) .... Otto König
 Die blaue Kanone (1999, TV Movie) .... Harry Groß
 Murder on the Orient Express (2001, TV Movie) .... Wolfgang Bouc
 Vera Brühne (The Trials of Vera B., 2001, TV Movie) .... Lawyer Dr. Wallner
 Hochwürden wird Papa (2002, TV Movie) .... Oskar Lindner
 Um Himmels Willen (2002–2020, TV Series) .... Wolfgang Wöller
 Männer im gefährlichen Alter (2004, TV Movie) .... Henry Malek
 Derrick – Die Pflicht ruft! (2004) .... Harry Klein (voice)
 Ein Engel namens Hans-Dieter (2004, TV Movie) .... Hans-Dieter Anhäuser
 Rikets Røst (2007, TV Series) .... Harry Klein
 Ein unverbesserlicher Dickkopf (2007, TV Movie) .... Balthasar Pelkofer
 Mord in bester Gesellschaft (2007–2017, TV Series) .... Dr. Wendelin Winter
 Unser Mann im Süden (2008, TV Series) .... Konsul Heinrich Hammerstein
 Baby frei Haus (2009, TV Movie) .... Kurt Schollwer
 Lindburgs Fall (2011, TV Movie) .... Peter Lindburg

References

External links

 
 Fritz Wepper Filmography in: The New York Times

1941 births
Living people
German male television actors
German male film actors
Male actors from Munich
20th-century German male actors
21st-century German male actors